Fernando Ansúrez or Ferdinand Ansúrez may refer to:
Fernando Ansúrez I (died c. 930), count of Castile
Fernando Ansúrez II (died 978), count of Monzón, grandson of the above